This is a list of disability organizations in Singapore.

General
 City Harvest Community Services Association 
 Disabled People's Association 
 Touch Community Services 
 Rainbow Centre 
 Presbyterian Community Services 
 Christian Outreach for The Handicapped 
 Extra•Ordinary People

Autism
 Autistic Association 
 Autism Resource Centre 
 Christian Outreach for The Handicapped 
 Pathlight School

Cerebral Palsy
 Spastic Association of Singapore

Cleft Lip & Palate 
 Cleft Lip and Palate Association of Singapore

Down syndrome
 Down Syndrome Association

Dyslexia
 Learning Needs Centre 
 Dyslexia Association of Singapore 
 Student Care Service 
 Swords & Stationery

Muscular Dystrophy 
 Muscular Dystrophy Association 
 Motor Neurone Disease Association

Deaf
 Singapore Association For the Deaf 
 Singapore School for the Deaf 
 Canossian School 
 ExtraOrdinary Horizons (Deaf Singapore)

Intellectual disabilities
 Movement for the Intellectually Disabled of Singapore 
 Association for Persons with Special Needs 
 Metta School 
 Grace Orchard School 
 SUN-DAC

Physical disabilities
 Handicaps Welfare Association 
 Society for the Physically Disabled 
National Disability League

Rare Disorders 
Rare Disorders Society of Singapore (RDSS)

Visual impairment
 Singapore Association of the Visually Handicapped

Others
 Children's Cancer Foundation 
 Singapore Children Society 
 Singapore Disability Sports Council 
 Special Olympics Singapore 
 Very Special Arts Singapore

See also
 List of youth organisations in Singapore
 List of social service agencies in Singapore

 
Disability organisations